Tom Hall  (born 17 September 1990) is a British Olympian archer from Kenilworth, England.

He competed as a member of the archery squad of Team GB at the 2020 Summer Olympics, in Tokyo.

He first took up archery in 2010 while studying at the University of Warwick. He holds a PhD in chemistry.

References

Living people
1990 births
People from Kenilworth
Olympic archers of Great Britain
Archers at the 2020 Summer Olympics
British male archers
European Games competitors for Great Britain
Archers at the 2019 European Games